This is a list of current and former Roman Catholic churches in the Roman Catholic Diocese of Grand Rapids. The diocese is located in the western portion of Michigan's lower peninsula and includes the city of Grand Rapids and 11 counties: Ionia, Kent, Lake, Mason, Mecosta, Montcalm, Muskegon, Newaygo, Oceana, Osceola, and Ottawa.

The cathedral church of the diocese is the Cathedral of Saint Andrew in Grand Rapids.

Kent County

Grand Rapids

Outside Grand Rapids

East Diocese (Ionia and Montcalm Counties)

Mid Diocese (Mecosta, Newaygo and Oceana Counties)

North Diocese (Lake, Mason and Osceola Counties)

West Diocese (Muskegon and Ottawa Counties)

References

 
Kalamazoo
Churches